George Armitstead may refer to:

 George Armitstead, 1st Baron Armitstead (1824–1912), British businessman, philanthropist and Liberal politician
 George Armitstead (mayor) (1847–1912), engineer, entrepreneur and mayor of Riga